Bo Alexander Ljungberg (21 November 1911 – 19 March 1984) was a Swedish athlete. He won two silver medals in the pole vault at the European Championships and competed in the 1936 Summer Olympics as both a pole vaulter and a triple jumper.

Career
Bo Ljungberg won gold in the pole vault at the 1933 International University Games in Turin, clearing 3.90 m. At the following year's European Championships, also in Turin, he jumped 4.00 m and won silver behind Germany's Gustav Wegner; he also competed in the triple jump, placing 8th with 14.01 m.

He also took part in both events at the 1936 Summer Olympics in Berlin; in the triple jump he managed 14.35 m and placed eighteenth, while in the pole vault he again cleared 4.00 m and shared sixth place with ten others. At the 1938 European Championships he repeated his silver medal from four years before, clearing 4.00 m once more. In 1939 he won a second International University Games medal, clearing 3.90 m for third place.

Ljungberg set his personal pole vault best, 4.15 m, in 1935, breaking Henry Lindblad's Swedish record of 4.13 m from the 1931 Finnkampen. The new record lasted until 1946, when Lars Andrén cleared 4.16 m. Ljungberg's personal best in the triple jump was 14.73 m from 1934.

References

External links
Profile

1911 births
1984 deaths
People from Hässleholm Municipality
Swedish male pole vaulters
Swedish male triple jumpers
Athletes (track and field) at the 1936 Summer Olympics
Olympic athletes of Sweden
European Athletics Championships medalists
Sportspeople from Skåne County